Zorobabel Rodríguez (1849–1901) was a Chilean lawyer, politician, writer and journalist. He was born in Quillota on October 4, 1849, and died in Valparaiso on September 29, 1901. He founded the El Independiente and La Union newspapers. He was the son of José Martín Rodríguez Osorio and Francisca Benavides Carrera.

Education and career
Rodríguez earned a law degree on October 1, 1884. That same year, and until 1887 he served as professor of economics at the Faculty of Law at the University of Chile.

Politically he campaigned for the Conservative Party, functioning as alternate deputy for Chillán in three consecutive periods: from 1870 to 1873, 1873 to 1876 and 1876 to 1879. He was alternate deputy for Santiago twice from 1879 to 1882 and from 1888 to 1891. He was also alternate deputy for Linares, from  1885 to 1888.

In 1891 participated in the revolution against the Balmaceda government.

He was also superintendent of customs at Valparaiso, from 1891 to 1901.

Works
 1864 - La cueva del loco Eustaquio - The cave of the mad Eustatius.
 1875 - Diccionario de chilenismos - Dictionary of Chileanisms.
 1893 - Estudios económicos - Economic studies.
 Francisco Bilbao: su vida y sus doctrinas - 'Francisco Bilbao: His life and doctrines.
 Perfiles y reminiscencias - Profiles and Reminiscences.
 Tratado de economía política - Treatise on political economy.

References 

Members of the Chamber of Deputies of Chile
Chilean male writers
Chilean journalists
Male journalists
1849 births
1901 deaths
Academic staff of the University of Chile
Conservative Party (Chile) politicians
19th-century Chilean lawyers